Richardson is a crater in the Mare Australe quadrangle on Mars, located at 72.6°S and 180.4°W. It measures 95.9 kilometers in diameter and was named after Lewis Fry Richardson. The name was approved by the International Astronomical Union in 1973.

See also 
 Climate of Mars
 Geology of Mars
 Geyser (Mars)
 Impact crater
 Impact event
 List of craters on Mars
 Ore resources on Mars
 Planetary nomenclature
 Water on Mars

References 

Impact craters on Mars
Mare Australe quadrangle